Paul Harry Henson (July 22, 1925 - April 12, 1997) built the first large scale fiber optic network while at United Telecommunications.

Biography
He was born on July 22, 1925 in Lincoln, Nebraska. He served in the United States Army Air Corps during World War II. He attended the University of Nebraska and received both a bachelor's and master's degrees in electrical engineering. He died on April 12, 1997 in Palm Springs, California.

References

1925 births
1997 deaths
University of Nebraska alumni
Sprint Corporation people
American electrical engineers